Isabel Cueto was the defending champion, but lost in the quarterfinals to Federica Bonsignori.

Bonsignori won the title by defeating Laura Garrone 2–6, 6–3, 6–3 in the final.

Seeds

Draw

Finals

Top half

Bottom half

References

External links
 Official results archive (ITF)
 Official results archive (WTA)

Women's Singles